The Susanto Cabinet was the first cabinet of the Republic of Indonesia while it was one of 16 states in the United States of Indonesia. It served from 27 December 1949 until 16 January 1950, when a permanent cabinet under the leadership of Prime Minister Abdul Halim was appointed.

Composition

Cabinet Leadership
Acting Prime Minister: Soesanto Tirtoprodjo (Indonesian National Party – PNI)

Departmental Ministers
Minister of Home Affairs: Soesanto Tirtoprodjo (Indonesian National Party – PNI)
Minister of Justice: Soesanto Tirtoprodjo (Indonesian National Party – PNI)
Minister of Information: Samsudin (Masyumi Party)
Minister of Finance: Lukman Hakim (Indonesian National Party – PNI)
Minister of Supply of People's  Provisions: I.J. Kasimo (PKRI)
Minister of Welfare: I.J. Kasimo (PKRI)
Minister of Labor and Social Affairs: Koesnan (PGRI)
Minister of Education & Culture: S. Mangunsarkoro (Indonesian National Party – PNI)
Minister of Religious Affairs: Masjkur (Masyumi Party)

References
 

Cabinets of Indonesia
1949 establishments in Indonesia
1950 disestablishments in Indonesia
Cabinets established in 1949
Cabinets disestablished in 1950